DASC may refer to:

Design Automation Standards Committee
Direct Air Support Center 
Digital Active Signal Collector